The 41st Ryder Cup Matches were held in the United States from September 30 to October 2, 2016, at the Hazeltine National Golf Club in Chaska, Minnesota, a suburb southwest of Minneapolis. Europe entered the competition as the cup holders, having won in 2014 in Scotland for their third consecutive win.

The United States won for the first time since 2008 at Valhalla, and featured the most lopsided American victory since a 9-point win in 1981 at Walton Heath. As in 2008, the U.S. never trailed during the tournament. Ryan Moore defeated Lee Westwood by 1 hole to reclaim the Cup with three matches still in progress. Captain Davis Love III dedicated the win to Arnold Palmer, who had died five days before the competition at the age of 87 while awaiting heart surgery. A bag from Palmer's captaincy in 1975 at Laurel Valley was placed on the first tee during Friday's opening foursomes to honor "The King", and Team USA also swept the opening foursomes on Friday morning for the first time since 1975. Two days after the matches, the majority of Team USA attended Palmer's public memorial at Saint Vincent College in his hometown of Latrobe, Pennsylvania, and brought the trophy at the request of Palmer's daughter Amy. Palmer had also had a video tribute at the opening ceremony and tributes in remarks from both captains (Love and Darren Clarke) and both honorary captains (Jack Nicklaus and Tony Jacklin).

Format
The Ryder Cup is a match play event, with each match worth one point. The competition format is as follows:
Day 1 (Friday) – 4 foursome (alternate shot) matches and 4 fourball (better ball) matches
Day 2 (Saturday) – 4 foursome matches and 4 fourball matches
Day 3 (Sunday) – 12 singles matches

On the first two days there are 4 foursome matches and 4 fourball matches with the home captain choosing which are played in the morning and which in the afternoon.

With a total of 28 points available, 14 points are required to win the Cup, and 14 points are required for the defending champion, Europe, to retain the Cup. All matches are played to a maximum of 18 holes according to the current format.

Course

The announcement that the PGA of America had selected Hazeltine as the venue for the 2016 Ryder Cup was made on April 22, 2002.

The order of holes is different from that normally used for the course. The front nine are current holes 1–4 and 14–18 while the back nine
are current holes 10–13 and 5–9.

Television
The 2016 Ryder Cup was televised in the United States by Golf Channel and NBC, which planned to provide 170 hours of coverage. In the United Kingdom and Ireland, the event was broadcast by Sky Sports; the broadcaster re-branded its Sky Sports 4 channel as Sky Sports Ryder Cup for the week of the event, and planned to broadcast 240 hours of coverage.

Task Force
Following the European victory in the 2014 Ryder Cup, the PGA of America created a "Ryder Cup Task Force". The Task Force consisted of three PGA officials and eight players with Ryder Cup experience. There were three previous Ryder Cup captains: Raymond Floyd, Tom Lehman and Davis Love III together with Rickie Fowler, Jim Furyk, Phil Mickelson, Steve Stricker and Tiger Woods. The Task Force considered a number of issues including the selection of the Ryder Cup captain and vice-captains and the team selection process.

The conclusions of the Task Force were announced on February 24, 2015, with the announcement of a number of changes for the 2016 contest. Davis Love III was selected as the captain, while new criteria were specified for the selection of vice-captains. In addition a number of changes were made to the team selection process for 2016. The 11-man Task Force was disbanded after the announcement and replaced with a smaller 6-man "Ryder Cup Committee" which included Love, Mickelson and Woods.

Team qualification and selection

United States
The United States qualification rules were announced by the Task Force on February 24, 2015. The majority of the team was selected from the Ryder Cup points list which was based on prize money won in important tournaments. Generally one point was awarded for every $1,000 earned. The team consisted of:

 The leading eight players on the Ryder Cup points list, gained in the following events
2015 major championships
2015 World Golf Championship events and The Players Championship (half points)
2016 major championships (double points)
2016 PGA Tour events. Qualifying events in this category were those played between January 1 and August 28, 2016, including The Barclays. "Alternate" events (those played opposite a major or WGC event) did not earn points
 Four captain's picks
Three announced after the 2016 BMW Championship, which concluded on September 11.
One announced after the 2016 Tour Championship, which concluded on September 25.

There were a number of changes from 2014. The number of captain's picks was increased from three to four with the selections being made later than previously, especially moving the fourth and last pick to less than a week before the Ryder Cup, right after the completion of the Tour Championship. The qualifying events included both the 2015 World Golf Championships events and The Players Championship, on top of the four 2015 major championships as in previous years, but only included 2016 PGA Tour events actually played in 2016, thus excluded any other event played in 2015. The qualifying period was also extended because the Olympic Games had moved the timeslot for the 2016 PGA Championship which took place already at the end of July.

The leading 15 players (and including the last captain's pick who was in 20th place) in the final points list were:

Players in qualifying places are shown in green. Captain's picks are shown in yellow.

Europe
The European team qualification rules were announced on May 26, 2015. The basic qualification rules were unchanged from those for the 2014 event. The team consisted of:

 The leading four players on the Ryder Cup European Points List
Points earned in all Race to Dubai tournaments starting with the 2015 M2M Russian Open and ending with the 2016 Made in Denmark that finished on August 28, 2016.
 The leading five players, not qualified above, on the Ryder Cup World Points List
Total World Rankings Points earned in Official World Golf Ranking events starting on September 3, 2015 (the start date of the M2M Russian Open), and ending with the Made in Denmark tournament that finished on August 28, 2016, except that (i) all events in the week finishing on August 14, 2016 (the week of the men's Olympic tournament), were excluded and (ii) only the Made in Denmark tournament ending on August 28, 2016, was counted for that week. The Open de France was allocated Ryder Cup points based on the OWGR points scale for a tournament whose winner earns 64 OWGR points, though the winner actually only earned 42 OWGR points.
 Three captain's picks
Announced in the week starting August 29, 2016.

Only European members of the European Tour were eligible for the team and players could only earn points in the above two lists while they were a member of the European Tour. Paul Casey was not a member of the European Tour and was ineligible to earn points or be selected to the team. Russell Knox was not yet a member of the European Tour when he won the 2015 WGC-HSBC Champions. Two weeks after that win, he took up membership in order to try to qualify for the Ryder Cup, but the money and the approximately 90 OWGR points he had earned since the start of the qualification period did not count toward his Ryder Cup point totals. If these OWGR points had counted, he would have qualified easily by finishing fourth on the world ranking list; instead, he finished in tenth place, 12.36 OWGR points from automatic qualification, and was not selected as a captain's pick.

The leading players in the European Ryder Cup points lists were:

Players in qualifying places (Q) are shown in green; captain's picks (P) are shown in yellow; those in italics (q) qualified through the other points list.

Sergio García and Justin Rose, who qualified through the World points list, finished in 17th and 26th place respectively on the European points list.

Teams

Captains
Darren Clarke was named as the European captain on February 18, 2015. He was selected by a five-man selection panel consisting of the last three Ryder Cup captains: Paul McGinley, José María Olazábal, Colin Montgomerie, another ex-Ryder Cup player David Howell and the European Tour chief executive George O'Grady.

Davis Love III was named the United States captain on February 24, 2015. He had previously captained the 2012 team.

Vice-captains
Each captain selects a number of vice-captains to assist him during the tournament.

Clarke selected Thomas Bjørn, Pádraig Harrington, and Paul Lawrie as European team vice-captains in May 2016. He added Ian Poulter in June and Sam Torrance in July.

Tom Lehman was named as a United States vice-captain at the same press conference that Love was named as captain. In November 2015 three more vice-captains were named: Jim Furyk, Steve Stricker and Tiger Woods. All three had been members of the American Task Force. On September 27, 2016, Love selected Bubba Watson as the fifth vice-captain.

Players

Captain's picks are shown in yellow. Davis Love III announced three captain's picks at 11:00 EDT on September 12. Ryan Moore was announced as the final captain's pick during halftime of the Sunday night NFL game on September 25. The world rankings and records are at the start of the 2016 Ryder Cup.

Darren Clarke announced the three captain's picks at 12.30 BST on August 30. Captain's picks are shown in yellow. The world rankings and records are at the start of the 2016 Ryder Cup.

Friday's matches
The tournament began with the alternate shot foursomes in the morning followed by four fourball matches in the afternoon. The pairings for the foursomes were announced on Thursday September 29.

Morning foursomes
Team USA swept the morning foursomes. It was the first time since 1975 that they had swept the opening session and the first time since 1981 that they had swept any session.

Afternoon fourballs

Saturday's matches

Morning foursomes

Afternoon fourballs
Patrick Reed and Jordan Spieth played together for the fourth time in the 2016 Ryder Cup and, having been paired together three times in 2014, became the first American pairing to play seven matches. By winning their match they also equaled the American record of 5 points set by Gardner Dickinson and Arnold Palmer in 1967 and 1971.

Sunday's singles matches
The deciding moment for the USA with reaching 14 points to clinch victory belonged to Ryan Moore who defeated Lee Westwood on the 18th green. Thomas Pieters became the first European rookie to score 4 points, beating the previous record of 3 set by Paul Way in 1983 and by Sergio García and Paul Lawrie in 1999.

Individual player records
Each entry refers to the win–loss–half record of the player.

United States

Europe

References

External links

2016
2016 Ryder Cup
2016 Ryder Cup
2016 Ryder Cup
2016 in golf
2016 in American sports
2016 in sports in Minnesota
September 2016 sports events in the United States
October 2016 sports events in the United States